Scelotes arenicola, the Zululand dwarf burrowing skink, is a species of lizard which is found in South Africa, Mozambique, and Eswatini.
Note: the correct species name is arenicola, a noun in apposition, meaning a sand dweller, and does not change according to the gender of the genus name

References

arenicola
Reptiles of South Africa
Reptiles described in 1854
Taxa named by Wilhelm Peters
Taxobox binomials not recognized by IUCN